Life Without Principle is a 2011 Hong Kong crime drama film produced and directed by Johnnie To and starring Lau Ching-wan, Richie Jen and Denise Ho. This film was screened in competition at the 68th Venice Film Festival on 9 September 2011. The North America distribution rights was purchased by Indomina Group shortly after the Festival. The deal was made between Indomina and the film's sales agent Media Asia Group.

The film was selected as the Hong Kong entry for the Best Foreign Language Oscar at the 85th Academy Awards, but it did not make the final shortlist.

Cast
Lau Ching-wan as Panther (三腳豹)
Richie Jen as Senior Inspector Cheung Ching-fong (張正方)
Denise Ho as Teresa Chan
Myolie Wu as Connie
Lo Hoi-pang as Chung Yuen (鍾原)
So Hang-suen as Cheng Siu-kuen (鄭小娟)
Philip Keung as Dragon (凸眼龍)
Cheung Siu-fai as Ng Yiu-wah (吳耀華)
Felix Wong as Sam (火爆森)
Wong Chi-yin as Sergeant Lee Chi-man (李致文)
Stephanie Che as Jackie
JJ Jia as Ms. Ho (何小姐)
Yoyo Chen as T.T. Chau
Terence Yin as Mr. Sung (宋先生)
Tam Ping-man as Lai Kwan (黎坤)
Lee Siu-kei as Brother Sai (西哥)
Frankie Ng as Brother B (B哥)
Alan Chui Chung-San as Sung's Thug
Law Wing-cheung as Master Wing (榮師傅)
Vincent Sze as East Kowloon Anti-Crime Unit officer
Anson Leung as Kwan Tat-man (關達文)
Ellesmere Choi as Short film narrator

Awards and nominations
31st Hong Kong Film Awards

Won
Best Supporting Actor (Lo Hoi-pang)
Best Supporting Actress (So Hang-suen)
Nominated
Best Film
Best Director (Johnnie To)
Best Screenplay (Yau Nai-hoi, Yip Tin-shing, Ben Wong, Jeff Cheung)
Best Actor (Lau Ching-wan)
Best Editing (David M. Richardson)
Best Original Song

48th Golden Horse Awards

Won
Best Actor (Sean Lau)
Best Director (Johnnie To)
Best Original Screenplay (Yau Nai-hoi, Yip Tin-shing, Ben Wong, Jeff Cheung)

Nominated
Best Film
Best Actress (Denise Ho)
Best Film Editing (David M. Richardson)

See also
 List of submissions to the 85th Academy Awards for Best Foreign Language Film
 List of Hong Kong submissions for the Academy Award for Best Foreign Language Film

References

External links
 Official website
 
 Life Without Principle at Hong Kong Cinemagic
 

Hong Kong crime drama films
2011 films
2011 crime drama films
2011 crime thriller films
2010s Cantonese-language films
Media Asia films
Milkyway Image films
Films directed by Johnnie To
Films set in Hong Kong
Films shot in Hong Kong
Films whose director won the Best Director Golden Horse Award